Sanyogitabai Holkar of Indore (1914 - 1937), was an Indian socialite and queen, the wife of Maharaja Yashwant Rao Holkar II of the princely state of Indore, British India.

Biography
She was born in 1914 in Tarasp, Switzerland, to Rajashri Dattajirao, the chief of Kagal (Junior), and educated in England. At the age of 10 she married 16 year old Yashwant Rao Holkar of the princely state of Indore. He became Maharaja two years later.

Along with her husband, she was extensively photographed by Man Ray. She contributed to efforts in the Eckart Muthesius designed palace, Manik Bagh.

Death and legacy
She died in a nursing home in St. Moritz, Switzerland, in 1937, at the age of 23 years. Sanyogitaganj, formerly the residency bazaar of Chawanni, in Indore is named for her. In 1980, many items from Manik Bagh were sold at auction in Monaco. In 2019, many were placed on display at an exhibition at the Museum of Decorative Arts in Paris.

Gallery

References

Further reading

Indian queens
1914 births
1937 deaths
People from Kolhapur
Indian socialites
Indian princesses